The 3rd constituency of Deux-Sèvres (French: Troisième circonscription des Deux-Sèvres) is a French legislative constituency in the Deux-Sèvres département. Like the other 576 French constituencies, it elects one MP using a two round electoral system.

Description

The 3rd Constituency of Deux-Sèvres covers the northern portion of the Department including the small town of Thouars.

Politically the seat has traditionally leaned to the right, however in 2017 it swung heavily to En Marche!. Amongst its previous representatives was Jean de Gaulle grandson of Charles de Gaulle.

Deputies

Election results

2022

2017

 
 
 
 
 
 
 
|-
| colspan="8" bgcolor="#E9E9E9"|
|-

2012

 
 
 
 
 
 
|-
| colspan="8" bgcolor="#E9E9E9"|
|-

2007

 
 
 
 
 
 
|-
| colspan="8" bgcolor="#E9E9E9"|
|-

2002

 
 
 
 
 
 
|-
| colspan="8" bgcolor="#E9E9E9"|
|-

1997

References

3